
Francesco Francia, whose real name was Francesco Raibolini (1447 – 5 January 1517) was an Italian painter, goldsmith, and medallist from Bologna, who was also director of the city mint.

He may have trained with Marco Zoppo and was first mentioned as a painter in 1486. His earliest known work is the Felicini Madonna, which is signed and dated 1494. He worked in partnership with Lorenzo Costa, and was influenced by Ercole de' Roberti's and Costa's style. After 1505 he was influenced more by Perugino and Raphael. He had a large workshop and trained Marcantonio Raimondi, Ludovico Marmitta, and several other artists; he produced niellos, in which Raimondi first learnt to engrave, soon excelling his master, according to Vasari. Raphael's Santa Cecilia is supposed to have produced such a feeling of inferiority in Francia that it caused him to die of depression. However, as his friendship with Raphael is now well-known, this story has been discredited.

He died in Bologna. His sons Giacomo Francia and Giulio Francia were also artists.

Works (selection of paintings)

Until 1500 
 Crucifixion with St. John and St. Jerome, c. 1485, 52 cm x 33 cm, oil on wood, Palazzo d'Accursio, Bologna
 The Holy Family, c. 1485, 54 cm x 40 cm, oil on wood, Gemäldegalerie, Berlin
 The Virgin and Child with an Angel, c. 1490, 58 cm x 44 cm, oil on wood, Carnegie Museum of Art, Pittsburgh
 Bartolomeo Bianchini, c. 1485–1500, 57 cm x 41 cm, oil on wood, National Gallery, London
 Baptism of Jesus, c. 1490, 29 cm x 55 cm, oil on wood, Calouste Gulbenkian Museum, Lisbon
 Madonna and Child with two Angels, c. 1495, 64 cm x 49 cm, oil on wood, Alte Pinakothek, Munich
 Pala Calcina, 1500, 193 cm x 151 cm, tempera and oil on canvas (formerly wood), Hermitage Museum, Saint Petersburg

Years 1500-10 
 Madonna and Child, c. 1500, 67 cm x 52 cm, oil on wood, Wallington National Trust, Northumberland
 Madonna and Child with Saints Francis and Jerome, 1500–10, 75 cm x 57 cm, tempera on wood, Metropolitan Museum of Art, New York
 The Annunciation with St. Albert the Carmelite, c. 1503–04, 182 cm x 132 cm, oil on canvas (formerly wood), Musée Condé, Chantilly
 Adoration of the Child, 1500–05, 175 cm x 132 cm, oil on wood, Alte Pinakothek, Munich 
 Evangelista Scappi, 1500–05, 55 cm x 44 cm, oil on wood, Uffizi, Florence
 Bishop Altobello Averoldo, c. 1505, 54 cm x 41 cm, oil on wood, National Gallery of Art, Washington
 Crucifixion, c. 1505, 246 cm x 146 cm, oil on wood, San Giacomo Maggiore, Bologna
 The life of Saint Cecilia and her husband Valerian - scene 1 (The Marriage) & 10 (The Burial), 1504–1506, 360 cm x 290 cm, frescoes, Oratorio di Santa Cecilia, Bologna
 Venus and Cupid, 1505–10, 80 cm x 49 cm, oil on wood, Musée des Beaux-Arts de Mulhouse
 Baptism of Jesus, 1509, 209 cm x 169 cm, oil on wood, Gemäldegalerie Alte Meister, Dresden

After 1510 
 The Holy Family, c. 1510, 64 cm x 49 cm, oil on wood, Museum of Fine Arts, Budapest
 Federico Gonzaga (son of Isabella d'Este), 1510, 45 cm x 34 cm, oil on wood transferred to canvas and finally again on wood, Metropolitan Museum of Art, New York
 Portrait likely Isabella d'Este, 1511, 44 cm x 35 cm, oil on wood, Vienne
 Pala Buonvisi, 1510–12, 195 cm x 180 cm, oil on wood, National Gallery, London
 Virgin and the Child and the Infant St. John the Baptist, 1510–15, 65 cm x 51 cm, oil on wood, São Paulo Museum of Art
 Virgin and the Child and the Infant St. John the Baptist (Francesco Francia and sons), c. 1515, 115 cm x 94 cm, oil on wood, National Gallery of Victoria, Melbourne

See also
 Adoration of the Shepherds (Raphael)

References

Citations

Sources

 Giorgio Vasari: Le vite dei più eccellenti architetti, pittori et scultori italiani, Florence 1568
 George C. Williamson: Francesco Raibolini, called Francia, London 1901
 Giuseppe Piazzi: Le Opere di Francesco Raibolini, detto il Francia, orefice e pittore. Azzoguidi, Bologna 1925
 Emilio Negro, Nicosetta Roio: Francesco Francia e la sua scuola. Artioli Editore, Modena 1998,

Further reading

 (see index; plate 91)

External links

 

1450s births
1517 deaths
15th-century Italian painters
16th-century Italian painters
Artists from Bologna
Court painters
Italian goldsmiths
Italian male painters
Italian medallists